James Hopkins may refer to:

James Hopkins (footballer, born 1873) (1873–?), English association football player for Manchester United
James Hopkins (footballer, born 1901) (1901–1943), Northern Irish association football player for Arsenal and Brighton
James C. Hopkins (architect) (1873–1938), Massachusetts architect, partner in Kilham & Hopkins
James C. Hopkins, Jr. (architect) (c. 1914–1998), his son, also architectural firm partner
James C. Hopkins (lawyer) (1819–1877), legislator, lawyer, and judge of New York and Wisconsin
James Frank Hopkins (1845–1913), Confederate Army volunteer and founder of the Sigma Nu fraternity at the VMI
James G. Hopkins (1801–1860), New York politician
James Herron Hopkins (1832–1904), American politician
James Scott-Hopkins (1921–1995), British Conservative Party politician
Jim Hopkins (born 1946), New Zealand TV personality
Jimmy Hopkins, fictional character in the video game, Bully